The Andy Warhol Diaries is the dictated memoirs of the American artist Andy Warhol, posthumously published. It was edited by his frequent collaborator and long-time friend, Pat Hackett. Warner Books first published it in 1989 with an introduction by Hackett.

The 807-page book begins on November 24, 1976 and ends eleven years later on February 17, 1987, just five days before his death. It is a condensed version by Hackett of Warhol's more than 20,000-page diary.

History
Beginning in the fall of 1976, Monday through Friday, Warhol and Hackett talked by phone each morning around 9:00 a.m. and he spoke to her about the events of the previous day. Weekend entries were done the following Monday in a longer session. Hackett transcribed his monologue onto a legal pad. Later in the morning she would use a typewriter to create the diary pages. "But whatever its broader objective," Hackett writes, "its narrow one, to satisfy tax auditors, was always on Andy's mind." The Internal Revenue Service audited Warhol annually.

The Andy Warhol Diaries was published in 1989, after Warhol's death in February 1987, without an index. Subsequently, unauthorized indexes were published by Spy and Fame magazines. Newer editions of the book contain an authorized index.

Adaptation

Warhol's diaries were adapted into a six-part television documentary series. Written and directed by Andrew Rossi, the eponymous series premiered March 9, 2022, on Netflix.

References

External links
 

1989 non-fiction books
Books by Andy Warhol
Books published posthumously
Diaries
English-language books
Warner Books books